The Picture of Dorian Grey (Russian: Портрет Дориана Грея) is a 1915 Russian silent drama film directed by Vsevolod Meyerhold and Mikhail Doronin. It is an adaptation of Oscar Wilde's novel of the same title.

The film's art direction was by Vladimir Yegorov.

Plot summary

Cast
 Varvara Yanova as Dorian Grey  
 Vsevolod Meyerhold as Lord Henry Wotton  
 G. Enriton 
 P. Belova 
 Doronin 
 Yelizaveta Uvarova
 Alexandre Volkoff

See also
 Adaptations of The Picture of Dorian Gray

References

Bibliography 
 Christie, Ian & Taylor, Richard. The Film Factory: Russian and Soviet Cinema in Documents 1896-1939. Routledge, 2012.

External links 
 
 

Films of the Russian Empire
1915 films
Russian silent films
1910s Russian-language films
Films based on The Picture of Dorian Gray
Russian black-and-white films
Russian drama films
1915 drama films
Silent drama films